Josef Bek (1918–1995) was a Czech film and television actor.

Selected filmography
 Playing with the Devil (1945)
 The Strike (1947)
 Případ Z-8 (1948)
 Anna Proletářka (1953)
 The Strakonice Bagpiper (1955)
 Escape from the Shadows (1959)
 Konec cesty (1960)
 Lucie (1963)
 Svět otevřený náhodám (1971)
 Princess Goldilocks (1973)

References

External links

1918 births
1995 deaths
Czech male film actors
Czech male television actors
Actors from Hradec Králové
Czechoslovak male actors